Terence Beesley (7 September 1957 – 30 November 2017) was an English actor.

Early life
Born in London to Irish parents, he studied at the City Lit in London in 1980, and then trained as an actor at the London Academy of Music and Dramatic Art.

Career

Television
His television work included Cadfael, The Bill, Where the Heart Is, Heartbeat, Midsomer Murders, EastEnders (as Derek Branning in 1996), Casualty, Down to Earth, Plotlands,
Agatha Christie's Poirot, She's Out and What Remains. He starred in Peter Kosminsky's 15, The Life and Death of Phillip Knight, and played General Bennigsen in the [[War & Peace (2016 TV series)|BBC adaptation of War and Peace]].

Theatre
His stage work included British theatre performances as the title role in Shakespeare's Richard III (1995) and as the Vicomte de Valmont in Les Liaisons Dangereuses (1994) for multi Barrymore award winner director Mark Clements and his own adaptation (with Colin Wakefield) of Nikolai Gogol's "Diary of a Madman" (as a one-man play) at the Royal Exchange Theatre, Manchester. Along with Jonathan Church and Jules Melvin, he was a founder of the Triptych Theatre Company. Their first production, Jack Shepherd's In Lambeth at the Lyric Studio, received much critical acclaim.

Personal life
He met actress Ashley Jensen in 1999 when they were appearing in a production of King Lear at the Manchester Royal Exchange, and they married in Big Sur, California in 2007. Their son, Francis Jonathan Beesley, was born on 20 October 2009. 

Beesley died at the family home in Camerton, Somerset on 30 November 2017, aged 60, having been found unconscious in a car in his garage. An inquest in February 2018 ruled that he killed himself by carbon monoxide poisoning.

Filmography

References

External links

Terence Beesley (Aveleyman)

1957 births
2017 deaths
2017 suicides
20th-century English male actors
21st-century English male actors
Alumni of the London Academy of Music and Dramatic Art
English male film actors
English people of Irish descent
English male stage actors
English male television actors
Male actors from London
English male Shakespearean actors
Suicides by carbon monoxide poisoning
Suicides in England